Mechanicsburg is an unincorporated community in Washington Township, Boone County, in the U.S. state of Indiana.

History
Mechanicsburg was laid out in 1835. Many of the pioneer settlers were skilled mechanics, hence the name.

Geography

The town straddles Sugar Creek, where Indiana State Road 39 crosses the stream.  About two thirds of the residences, and the town's only church, are south of the stream.  There was a second bridge over Sugar Creek, which carried Burg Street, but this was demolished sometime between 1980 and 2000.

Culture
Mechanicsburg has one of the few remaining operational drive-in theaters, Mel's Drive-in (formerly the Frankfort-Lebanon Drive-in Theater).

References

Unincorporated communities in Boone County, Indiana
Unincorporated communities in Indiana